Hidden Charms is a blues album by Willie Dixon, released in 1988 on Bug/Capitol Records. It won a 1989 Grammy Award.

Production
The album was produced by T Bone Burnett. The band was made up of Cash McCall and Burnett on guitars, Sugar Blue on harmonica, Red Callender on bass, Lafayette Leake on piano, and Earl Palmer on drums. "Study War No More" was cowritten by Dixon's grandson.

Critical reception
The Globe and Mail wrote that "the band is excellent - rootsy and tough but not overpowering - and, while Dixon's hardly a mesmerizing singer, his gruff grandfatherly voice has a plaintive soulfullness that suits his more recent songs." The Kingston Whig-Standard wrote that "Leake's unique playing is alone worth the price of the album."

The Rolling Stone Album Guide called the album "a solid if unspectacular outing." Paste deemed it "a collection of overlooked Dixon gems."

Track listing
All tracks composed and arranged by Willie Dixon; except where indicated
"Blues You Can't Lose" 5:44
"I Don't Trust Myself" 4:23
"Jungle Swing" (Willie Dixon, Leonard Caston) 5:27
"Don't Mess With The Messer" 7:10
"Study War No More" (Willie Dixon, Alex Dixon) 4:33
"I Love The Life I Live (I Live The Life I Love)" 3:11
"I Cry For You" 4:40
"Good Advice" (Willie Dixon, J.B. Lenoir) 5:13
"I Do The Job" 6:22

Personnel
Willie Dixon - vocals
Cash McCall - electric guitar, National Steel resonator guitar, harmony vocals, associate producer
T Bone Burnett - dobro
Red Callender - bass
Lafayette Leake - piano
Earl Palmer - drums
Sugar Blue - harmonica
Technical
Rik Pekkonen - recording, mixing
Larry Hirsch - additional engineer
Nancy Meyer - project coordinator 
Marc Norberg - front cover portrait

References

1988 albums
Willie Dixon albums
Albums produced by T Bone Burnett
Capitol Records albums